Anatoli Ivanovich Bogdanov (1 January 1931 – 30 September 2001) was a Soviet sport shooter and Olympic champion.

Biography
Bogdanov was born in Leningrad. He won a gold medal in the 300 m rifle 3 pos at the 1952 Summer Olympics in Helsinki, as his teammate Lev Vainshtein won the bronze medal. He won a gold medal in the 50 m rifle 3 pos at the 1956 Summer Olympics in Melbourne. Competing at the 1954 ISSF World Shooting Championships in Caracas, Bogdanov won ten gold medals and three bronze medals. He died on 30 September 2001.

References

External links

1931 births
2001 deaths
Soviet male sport shooters
Russian male sport shooters
ISSF rifle shooters
Olympic shooters of the Soviet Union
Shooters at the 1952 Summer Olympics
Shooters at the 1956 Summer Olympics
Olympic gold medalists for the Soviet Union
Sportspeople from Saint Petersburg
Olympic medalists in shooting
Medalists at the 1952 Summer Olympics
Medalists at the 1956 Summer Olympics